The 1956 New Mexico gubernatorial election took place on November 6, 1956, in order to elect the Governor of New Mexico. Incumbent Democrat John F. Simms ran for reelection to a second term.

Democratic primary
The Democratic primary was won by incumbent governor John F. Simms.

Results

Republican primary
The Republican primary was won by former governor Edwin L. Mechem.

Results

General election

Results

References

1956
gubernatorial
New Mexico
November 1956 events in the United States